Jesse David Brand is an American songwriter, musician and actor.

Personal life
Jesse Brand was born in Ferndale, Washington. He is the youngest son of Steve Brand, former touring musician, playing drums and guitar for Country Music acts David Frizzell, Tex Williams, Rose Maddox, Rusty Draper, and Forrest Lee Sr, as well as touring with Rock and Roll bands like Creedence Clearwater Revival and Steppenwolf   and Gail Brand, an American Sign Language Interpreter and schoolteacher. He spent five years in the MPFL (minor professional football league) with the North Texas Stampede (Fort Worth, Texas) and Northwest Avalanche  (Bellingham, Washington). Jesse lives in Nashville, Tennessee.

Music career
During a 2011 interview on Talk It Up TV, Brand stated his dreams of a musical future started when he was six years old, while watching his father's band... "I saw what music did to those people, and I at that moment, made a conscious decision. I said to myself, that's what I'm gonna do with my life." He has shared stages with acts such as Lee Brice, Luke Bryan, Randy Houser, Jamey Johnson, Willie Nelson, Merle Haggard, Loretta Lynn, Kris Kristofferson, Bob Dylan, The Doobie Brothers, and has been in bands with Audley Freed and Charlie Daniels. To date, Jesse Brand has released 11 albums under his own label, FiveSlumpRecords, and is considered an important figure among today's songwriters "...prolific, elegant, beautiful and dark... he is one of the last of the true hardcore troubadours. In 2014, Jesse Brand won the Award for "Song of the Year", from the Academy of Texas Music, for his song "Praying For Rain". He was also nominated for "Male Vocalist of the Year", the same year.

Filmography

Discography
Live From The White Elephant (2004)
Pills Booze and Grass (2005)
The Cocaine Sessions (2006)
3 Steps To The Wishing Well (2007)
Tuggin' On The Devil's Sleeve (2008)
The Unreleased Bull Sessions (2008)
The Suicide Tapes (Unreleased) (2008)
28 Days (2009)
Through The Fire (2009)
Back Here On The Floor (Wisely and Slow) (2010)
When The Dust Settles Vol 1 (2013) 
When The Dust Settles Vol 2 (2014) 
The Charlie French Tapes (Working Title) (2015) - In Production
It Is What It Is (2015)

Nominations and awards

|-
|align="center"|Academy of Texas Music|2014
|"Praying For Rain"
|align="center"|Song of the Year
|
|-
|align="center"|Academy of Texas Music|2014
|"When The Dust Settles"
|align="center" rowspan="3"|Male Vocalist of the Year"
|
|-
|align="center"|Big Star Music Awards|2014
|"When The Dust Settles"
|
|-

General

2014 Won Academy of Texas Music "Song of the Year" for "Praying For Rain"
2014 Nominated Academy of Texas Music "Male Vocalist of the Year" for When The Dust Settles.  
2014 Nominated Big Star Music Awards "Male Vocalist of the Year"

References

External links

1976 births
Living people
American alternative country singers
American male singer-songwriters
American rock singers
Singer-songwriters from Texas
People from Ferndale, Washington
American country singer-songwriters
American country drummers
American country guitarists
American male guitarists
American country rock singers
Country musicians from Texas
American rock songwriters
Singer-songwriters from Washington (state)
Guitarists from Washington (state)
Guitarists from Texas
20th-century American drummers
American male drummers
21st-century American guitarists
21st-century American drummers
20th-century American male musicians
21st-century American male singers
21st-century American singers